Buddha Shanti Higher Secondary School is a higher secondary school located in Rapti Municipality, Chitwan. It was established in 2030 BS (1973) with the name Gadyauli Ma. Vi. and changed later to Buddha Shanti Higher Secondary School. Formerly it was named from the location of the school, Gadyauli, and later it was named for Buddha and Shanti (peace). In that way Buddha Shanti Secondary School is helping the nation to get into peace from providing education for the people of the nation. 

With more than 2,000 students, Buddha Shanti HSS is one of the leading educators in Chitwan district. 1-10 grade by the SLC board of Nepal, 11 and 12 grade by HSEB and bachelor's degree is affiliated by Tribhuvan University.

Secondary schools in Nepal